Lachemilla angustata is a species of plant in the family Rosaceae. It is endemic to Ecuador. , the genus Lachemilla was included in Alchemilla by Plants of the World Online, with Lachemilla angustata treated as "unplaced". Alchemilla angustata S.E.Fröhner is a different species, native to the Pyrenees.

References

angustata
Endemic flora of Ecuador
Vulnerable plants
Taxonomy articles created by Polbot